Topolinoye is a rural locality (a selo), the only inhabited locality, and the administrative center of Tomponsky National Rural Okrug of the Tompo District in the Sakha Republic, Russia. It is located on the left bank of the Tompo River,  from Khandyga, the administrative center of the district. Its population as of the 2010 Census was 915, of whom 458 were male and 457 female, up from 880 as recorded during the 2002 Census.


References

Notes

Sources
Official website of the Sakha Republic. Registry of the Administrative-Territorial Divisions of the Sakha Republic. Tomponsky District. 

Rural localities in Tomponsky District